Gareth David Hall (born 20 March 1969) is a Welsh former international footballer of the 1980s and 1990s.

Hall was born in Croydon. He started his career as an apprentice at Chelsea and made his first team debut on 5 May 1987 against Wimbledon, having featured in a reserve match earlier in the day. He made a total of 225 League appearances during his time at the club, although the number of matches he played was limited by the presence of Steve Clarke. Hall was a member of the Chelsea team that won the 1990 Full Members Cup at Wembley Stadium.

He moved to Sunderland in January 1996, having originally been on loan there. Hall went on to make 48 League appearances for the club.

Hall joined Swindon Town in May 1998 and played in most games during his first two seasons. Following the arrival of Colin Todd he was told he could leave on a free transfer, but continued training with the team and he ended up playing a few more matches for them, before leaving in May 2001 to join Havant & Waterlooville. In total he made 97 senior appearances for Swindon, scoring 3 goals.

He won 9 international caps for Wales, first being selected for the senior side on 23 March 1988, in a 2–1 friendly defeat to Yugoslavia. His last cap came on 29 April 1992 in a 1–1 friendly draw with Austria.

References

External links 
 
 

Living people
1969 births
Footballers from Croydon
Welsh footballers
Association football defenders
Chelsea F.C. players
Sunderland A.F.C. players
Brentford F.C. players
Swindon Town F.C. players
Havant & Waterlooville F.C. players
English Football League players
Premier League players
Wales international footballers